Nice an' Cool is an album by saxophonist Gene Ammons recorded in 1961 and released on the Moodsville, a subsidiary label of Prestige.

Reception
The AllMusic review stated: "A 1961 set of standards heavy on the ballads, Nice 'n Cool is prime Gene Ammons... Ammons' brilliantly soulful tenor saxophone really stretches out on the familiar melodies... Nice 'n Cool is first and foremost a mood album, with the unity of sound more important than the individual performances, but Ammons particularly shines."

Track listing 
 "Till There Was You" (Meredith Willson) - 7:08     
 "Answer Me, My Love" (Fred Rauch, Gerhard Winkler) - 4:35     
 "Willow Weep for Me" (Ann Ronell) - 4:04     
 "Little Girl Blue" (Lorenz Hart, Richard Rodgers) - 4:55     
 "Something I Dreamed Last Night" (Sammy Fain, Herb Magidson, Jack Yellen) - 7:41     
 "Something Wonderful" (Oscar Hammerstein II, Richard Rodgers) - 3:03     
 "I Remember You" (Johnny Mercer, Victor Schertzinger) - 4:21     
 "Someone to Watch Over Me" (George Gershwin, Ira Gershwin) - 3:48

Personnel 
Gene Ammons - tenor saxophone
Richard Wyands - piano
Doug Watkins - bass
J.C. Heard - drums

References 

1961 albums
Albums produced by Esmond Edwards
Albums recorded at Van Gelder Studio
Moodsville Records albums
Gene Ammons albums